Saoud Farhan (Arabic:سعود فرحان) (born 11 February 1995) is a Qatari footballer. He currently plays for Umm Salal.

References

External links
 

Qatari footballers
1995 births
Living people
Al-Rayyan SC players
CA Bizertin players
Al-Shahania SC players
Al Kharaitiyat SC players
Umm Salal SC players
Qatari expatriate footballers
Qatar Stars League players
Qatari Second Division players
Association football forwards
Footballers at the 2018 Asian Games
Asian Games competitors for Qatar
Expatriate footballers in Tunisia
Qatari expatriate sportspeople in Tunisia